"Ladyfingers" is a song performed by American alternative rock group Luscious Jackson, issued as the lead single from their third studio album Electric Honey. Written and co-produced by lead singer Jill Cunniff, the song peaked at #28 on the Billboard Alternative chart in 1999.

Music video

The official music video for "Ladyfingers" was directed by Tamra Davis. It features a “party bus”  full of revelers singing and dancing alongside Luscious Jackson, as well as outside amongst flowers and trees.

The music video can be seen in the 1999 Buffy the Vampire Slayer  episode Beer Bad.

Chart positions

References

External links
 
 

1999 songs
1999 singles
Grand Royal singles
Luscious Jackson songs
Music videos directed by Tamra Davis
Song recordings produced by Jill Cunniff
Songs written by Jill Cunniff